2Dark is a stealth adventure horror game directed by Frédérick Raynal, known for developing Alone in the Dark.

Plot
A former detective named Mr. Smith travels to the town of Gloomywood to solve a mystery involving disappearing children.

Gameplay
Gameplay is intended to be simplistic and accessible to casual gamers. The player can pick up items by walking into them. Stealth plays a large role in the gameplay, and the player can stay in the dark and tread quietly to hide their location. Enemies can be alerted by sounds that the player makes. Supplies are constricted, so it will benefit the player if they collect various items. The player will need to rescue children, who will move slowly and be susceptible to danger. The children are in intricate levels, which you will need to find them in, and escape. Left alone too long, the kids will start to cry and move, which will end up putting everyone in danger.

Development
2Dark was funded on Ulule on November 21, 2014.

On October 26, 2015, a trailer of 2Dark was published. It was confirmed that the game was being developed by a new French studio called Gloomywood, which initially consisted of four people, with Frédérick Raynal directing. The beta was made available to buy for €20.

The game was featured at E3 2015 and at the Game Developers Conference 2016.

On March 11, 2016, Gloomywood confirmed that 2Dark would be released on consoles in addition to PC.

After 2Darks release, people saw that the game was protected with the DRM Denuvo. During the Ulule campaign, Gloomywood promised that the game was going to be DRM free. Moreover, this means that Linux and Mac versions that were planned will never be released. As of April 19, 2017, six days after having been cracked by CPY, Denuvo has been removed from 2Dark.

Reception
2Dark garnered mixed reviews, and holds an average of 56/100 on aggregate web site Metacritic. PlayStation Universe awarded it a score of 4.0 out of 10, saying "The setup for 2Dark holds intrigue, with a grim plot, and suitably creepy settings, but so much of how it actually plays out quickly diminishes the horror aspect of it. Respectable enough as a game, a failure as a horror."

References

External links 
 
 Ulule page

2017 video games
Infogrames games
Cancelled Linux games
Cancelled macOS games
Nacon games
2010s horror video games
PlayStation 4 games
Stealth video games
Video games developed in France
Windows games
Xbox One games